Platyarthron is a genus of beetles in the subfamily Cerambycinae, and monotypic tribe Coelarthrini (a.k.a. Platyarthrini).

It contains many species including the following:

 Platyarthron bilineatum Guérin-Méneville, 1844
 Platyarthron chilense (Thomson, 1860)
 Platyarthron laterale Bates, 1885
 Platyarthron rectilineum Bates, 1880
 Platyarthron semivittatum Bates, 1885
 Platyarthron villiersi Delfino, 1985

References

Cerambycinae